Andrei Kerekeș (9 January 1925 – 3 January 1991) was a Romanian gymnast. He competed in eight events at the 1952 Summer Olympics.

References

1925 births
1991 deaths
Romanian male artistic gymnasts
Olympic gymnasts of Romania
Gymnasts at the 1952 Summer Olympics
Sportspeople from Reșița